Greg Johnson (born June 25, 1975, in Waupaca, Wisconsin, United States) is an American curler.

Teams

Men's

Mixed doubles

Private life
Greg Johnson resides in Appleton, Wisconsin. He works as Expeditor/sales with Valley Planing Mill, Inc.

He is single and has two daughters.

He started curling in 1987, when he was 12 years old.

References

External links

Living people
1975 births
People from Waupaca, Wisconsin
Sportspeople from Appleton, Wisconsin
American male curlers
American curling champions
Continental Cup of Curling participants